Caipiras are a traditional people from the Centre-South of Brazil, the term "caipira", probably originating from Tupi language, originally means "bush cutter", having been identified as a printed symbol for the first time in 1872. The first Caipiras were the bandeirantes, who received this denomination through the Guaianá people who inhabited the region of the Médio Tietê, in São Paulo.

With the Bandeirismo and tropeirismo cycle, the term reached populations of the former Captaincy of São Vicente (later Captaincy of São Paulo), which today are the states of Santa Catarina, Paraná, Goiás, São Paulo, Mato Grosso do Sul, Minas Gerais, Mato Grosso, Tocantins, Rondônia, and Rio Grande do Sul, and also parts of southern Rio de Janeiro, such as Paraty, which was part of São Paulo until 1727, and parts of Uruguay which were disputed with Spain. 

Over time, part of this large territory, which continued to be occupied by the Bandeirantes Paulistas, was characterised as a cultural area called Paulistânia, grouping together elements of caipira culture in states in the South, Southeast, and Centre-West of Brazil.

See also
 Caipira dialect
 Caipira music
 Caipira guitar
 Caboclos
 Gauchos
 Ribeirinhos
 Caiçaras
 Caipirinha, alcoholic drink whose name is a diminutive of caipira.

Notes

References

Bibliography

 Cândido, Antônio. Os parceiros do Rio Bonito  Sp, José Olympio, 1957.
 Monteiro Lobato, José Bento de. Urupês, Editora Monteiro Lobato e Cia., 1923.
 Nepomuceno, Rosa. Música Caipira, da roça ao rodeio, Editora 34, 1999.
 Queiróz, Renato da Silva. Caipiras Negros no Vale do Ribeira, Editora da USP, 1983.
 Pires, Cornélio. Conversas ao pé do fogo – IMESP, edição fac-similar, 1984.

Brazilian folklore
Ethnic groups in Brazil
Stereotypes of rural people